The girls' singles tournament of the 2016 BWF World Junior Championships is held on November 8–13. The defending champion of the last edition is Goh Jin Wei from Malaysia.

Seeded

Draw

Finals

Top Half

Section 1

Section 2

Section 3

Section 4

Section 5

Section 6

Section 7

Section 8

Botom Half

Section 9

Section 10

Section 11

Section 12

Section 13

Section 14

Section 15

Section 16

References

 Main Draw

2016 BWF World Junior Championships
Youth